Tata Starbus is a range of buses manufactured by Tata Motors. Tata Starbus is available in comprehensive range of variants, with or without low floor, with seating capacity of 16 to 67, it is available with options of diesel engine and also more environmentally friendly hybrid and CNG power plant. The Starbus range includes Standard, Deluxe, Low Floor and School bus options - each with a customised set of features.

Variants
 Starbus Skool
Incorporating over 19 essential features from the many others prescribed by the Government, the Starbus Skool provides the safest and most comfortable journey for school children. Is available in a range of 17, 32 and 52 seater. 
 Starbus Skool 17 - Chassis Platform -	SFC 407/31	
 Starbus Skool 32 - Chassis Platform - LP 709/38	
 Starbus Skool 52 - Chassis Platform - LP 1510/52
 Starbus Skool 48 - Chassis Platform - Ultra LPO 7.5/44
 Starbus Skool 48 AC - Chassis Platform - Ultra LPO 7.5/44
 Starbus Skool 58 - Chassis Platform - Ultra LPO 10.2/54
 Starbus Skool 58 AC - Chassis Platform - Ultra LPO 10.2/54

 Starbus Standard/Staff bus
Available in 16, 18, 20, 32, 54, and 67-seater configurations, Starbus Standard is built to handle varying road conditions without compromising passenger safety. 
 Starbus 16 - Chassis Platform - SFC 407/27 	
 Starbus 18 CNG - Chassis Platform - LP 407/31 CNG	 	
 Starbus 20 - Chassis Platform - SFC 407/31 	
 Starbus 32 - Chassis Platform - LP 709/38	
 Starbus 54 - Chassis Platform - LP 1510/53 	
 Starbus 67 - Chassis Platform - LPO 1610/62 	
 Starbus Ultra 34+D LPO 7.5/44
 Starbus Ultra 34+D AC LPO 7.5/44
 Starbus Ultra 40+D HBR AC LPO 10.2/54
 Starbus Ultra 44+D LPO 10.2/54
 Starbus Ultra 44+D AC LPO 10.2/54
 Starbus Ultra 50+D LPO 10.2/54

 Starbus Deluxe
Designed to allow inter-city travellers to commute quickly, comfortably and affordably between destinations. Starbus Deluxe variants are available in 18, 20, 28 and 35-seater configurations. 
 Starbus Dlx 18 - Chassis Platform - SFC 713/38	  	
 Starbus Dlx 20 - Chassis Platform - LP 407/31	
 Starbus Dlx 28 - Chassis Platform - LP 709/38	 	
 Starbus Dlx 35 - Chassis Platform - LPO 916/42	 	

 Starbus Urban
With an ultra-modern, low floor design have a floor height of 650 mm and broad doors allow passengers to board and alight quickly and easily. You can also opt for Ultra Low Floor City Buses, with a floor height of only 380mm. Also available are high floor chassis models adding with an additional door for transit use

Low Floor range

 Starbus LF - Chassis Platform - LPO 1610/59	
 Starbus ULF CNG - Chassis Platform - LPO 1623/62
 Tata Marcopolo Starbus ULF City - Chassis Platform - LPO 1623
 Tata Marcopolo Starbus ULF City Electric 
 Starbus ULF City Hybrid
 Starbus ULF City Electric

High Floor range

 Starbus 24+D LP 410/36
 Starbus 24+D AC LP 410/36
 Starbus 32+D LP 710/45
 Starbus 32+D AC LP 712/45
 Starbus 40+D LP 912/52
 Starbus 40+D LP 810/52
 Starbus 40+D AC LP 912/52
 Starbus 67 - Chassis Platform - LPO 1610/62 	
 Starbus Ultra 34+D LPO 7.5/44
 Starbus Ultra 34+D AC LPO 7.5/44
 Starbus Ultra 40+D HBR AC LPO 10.2/54
 Starbus Ultra 44+D LPO 10.2/54
 Starbus Ultra 44+D AC LPO 10.2/54
 Starbus Ultra 50+D LPO 10.2/54
 Tata Ultra 9/9m AC Electric Bus
 Tata Ultra 9/9m Non AC Electric Bus
 Tata Urban 9/12m AC Electric Bus
 Tata Urban 9/12m Non AC Electric Bus

Public transport 

The Tata Starbus has been in use by the Brihanmumbai Electricity Supply and Transport (BEST) in Mumbai since 2005.

References

External links

 http://buses.tatamotors.com/starbus.htm

2000s cars
Rear-engined vehicles
Vehicles introduced in 2006
Starbus